"Luxury Lounge" is the 72nd episode of the HBO original series The Sopranos and the seventh of the show's sixth season. Written by Matthew Weiner and directed by Danny Leiner, it originally aired on April 23, 2006.

Starring
 James Gandolfini as Tony Soprano
 Lorraine Bracco as Jennifer Melfi *
 Edie Falco as Carmela Soprano
 Michael Imperioli as Christopher Moltisanti
 Dominic Chianese as Corrado Soprano, Jr. *
 Steven Van Zandt as Silvio Dante
 Tony Sirico as Paulie Gualtieri
 Robert Iler as Anthony Soprano, Jr. *
 Jamie-Lynn Sigler as Meadow Soprano *
 Aida Turturro as Janice Soprano Baccalieri *
 Steven R. Schirripa as Bobby Baccalieri
 Frank Vincent as Phil Leotardo
 John Ventimiglia as Artie Bucco
 Ray Abruzzo as Little Carmine Lupertazzi
 Kathrine Narducci as Charmaine Bucco
 Dan Grimaldi as Patsy Parisi

* = credit only

Guest starring

Synopsis 
Corky Caporale provides the two Italian hitmen hired to kill Rusty with "clean" pistols and directions to his location; they kill Rusty and his bodyguard.

At Nuovo Vesuvio, Tony and Phil celebrate the induction of Gerry and Burt Gervasi into their respective crime families. During the party, there are mutters about the deteriorating quality of the restaurant. Tony later has a meal at Da Giovanni, a highly successful rival restaurant. Artie is facing problems at Nuovo Vesuvio: it is losing money and there are tensions with Benny, who is flirting with the new Albanian hostess, Martina. While nursing a drink at the Bada Bing, Artie confronts Tony about dining at Da Giovanni; Tony makes excuses. When he offers some tips to increase the restaurant's popularity, Artie angrily rebuffs him and suggests he settle his outstanding tab if he wants to help. Later, Artie rejects his wife Charmaine's suggestions to stop bothering his guests with table-side visits.

Fraud investigators for American Express visit Nuovo Vesuvio because someone is stealing credit card numbers from Artie's customers, and the restaurant's card usage has to be suspended. Artie learns Martina helped Benny steal the numbers and fires her. He then goes to Benny's house in the middle of the night and provokes a fistfight; Benny is left bleeding on his porch. Tony meets separately with the two men and compels them to make peace. At Tony's insistence, Benny's parents have their anniversary dinner at Nuovo Vesuvio. Artie visits them during their meal. In front of his pregnant wife, Artie offers Benny a "martina", explaining that it is an Albanian martini that "goes down real easy". An enraged Benny follows Artie into the kitchen and forces his right hand into a boiling pot of tomato sauce, badly burning him.

Christopher asks Tony's permission to fly to Los Angeles with Little Carmine to cast actors for Cleaver, and Tony reluctantly consents. While he is away, Murmur makes rounds for Chris; they include delivering card numbers to Ahmed and Muhammad, who are stealing money via the Internet. Benny takes over Chris' credit card operation, giving a cut to Tony.

In L.A., Chris and Little Carmine have a scheduled meeting with Ben Kingsley. He is not interested in Cleaver and interrupts Chris and Carmine to speak to Lauren Bacall, who is to be a presenter at an award show. Chris and Carmine then tag along with him, and Chris is astounded by the great quantity of free expensive luxury items the actor is offered. Chris later phones Kingsley, unsuccessfully asking him to arrange for Chris himself to enter their hotel's Luxury Lounge.

When Kingsley turns down Cleaver, Chris summons Murmur to L.A.; he finds Chris intoxicated in his hotel room. Once he sobers up, the two corner Kingsley in an elevator and try to subtly intimidate him into giving them access to the Luxury Lounge. Kingsley blurts out that award presenters get free goods worth around $30,000. Outside the awards show Chris, masked, mugs Bacall, stealing her gift bag. At home, he offers Tony some of the stolen goods, but Tony is more concerned with Chris' lack of focus, blaming his absence for the feud between Artie and Benny.

Deceased 
 Rusty Millio: assassinated on orders from Johnny "Sack" via Tony Soprano's enlisted hit men from Italy for potentially trying to take power away from Johnny again.
 Eddie Pietro: collateral damage from the Millio hit.
 An eastern cottontail: Shot by Artie Bucco while eating the vegetables in his garden.

Title reference 
 Christopher and Little Carmine follow Ben Kingsley through a celebrity Luxury Lounge where many free gifts are offered to celebrities.
 The title could refer to a luxury restaurant. Artie's fight for his restaurant against competitors and through hardships is one of the main storylines of the episode.
 The title could refer to the higher status of free luxury, enjoyed by people such as Tony Soprano and Benny Fazio, that comes to be resented by Artie Bucco who tries to make a living by "honest work," as did his father.

Production
 Creator David Chase makes his second cameo appearance on the series as a passenger on the plane to Italy during the last scene. Previously, he appeared as a man in Italy in the episode "Commendatori."

References to prior episodes 
 Tony reminds Artie about the time his family found refuge and happily dined at Nuovo Vesuvio during a heavy storm, which happened in "I Dream of Jeannie Cusamano."
 Christopher reminds Tony about the "huge sacrifice" made for him, turning on Adriana in "Long Term Parking."

Other cultural references
 Italo and Salvatore talk about visiting the World Trade Center site.
 Christopher refers to Vito Spatafore as "La Cage aux Fat." La Cage aux Folles is originally a French comedy play later turned into a movie about gay lovers. An American film remake of it is the 1996 The Birdcage.
 Tony says he saw CSI when Carlo starts talking about techniques that could track Vito.
 When Tony denies having anything to do with Rusty's murder, Phil Leotardo says the deed can then be credited to The Headless Horseman.
 Artie says the New Jersey Zagat described him as a "warm and convivial host."
 Artie tells Tony he would never allow his restaurant to turn into an IHOP.
 Potential directors for Cleaver were mentioned as Ridley Scott, Tobe Hooper or "the next James Wan"  (Saw).
 Little Carmine mentions Ben Kingsley's role as a villain in Sexy Beast.
 Christopher lists J.T. Dolan's screenwriting credits to Ben Kingsley, which include Nash Bridges, Hooperman, and Law & Order: SVU (mistakenly referring to it as "Law & Order: The SUV").
 Lauren Bacall says she will give awards at the ShoWest.
 Christopher tells Lauren Bacall that she was great in "The Haves And Have-Nots" (To Have and Have Not).
 Little Carmine tells Kingsley that they are considering Sam Rockwell for the young lead role.
 In the Luxury Lounge, some of the displayed items were: an iRiver MP3 player, Oris watches, and the video game True Crime: New York City on a television.
 Christopher tells Tony he and Little Carmine met Lindsay Lohan in LA.
 Italo and Salvatore examine a Montblanc pen.
 Phil Leotardo tells Tony that his "heart is an open book," a lyrical reference to the song "Live and Let Die."

Music
 The song being played at Nuovo Vesuvio when Artie surveys his mostly empty establishment is "La-La (Means I Love You)" by The Delfonics.
 The song being sung by Murmur when making the credit card collection from the Jewish-owned hotel is "Daniel" by Elton John.
 The song playing at the Bada Bing! where Ahmed and Muhammad get the stolen credit card numbers is "Dazz," a 1976 hit song by Brick.
The song playing at the Bada Bing when Artie confronts Tony about dining at Da Giovanni is "The Fire of Love" by The Barbarellatones.
 The song playing at the Luxury Lounge when Christopher looks around at the swag is "Welcome to New York City" by Cam'ron, from the True Crime: New York City's intro, briefly shown in the TV.
 When Artie meets the Benny Fazio party in his restaurant the song playing is "Whispering Bells" by The Del-Vikings.
 Closing credits music is a classical guitar piece called "Recuerdos de la Alhambra," composed by Francisco Tarrega and played by Pepe Romero.

External links
"Luxury Lounge"  at HBO

2006 American television episodes
The Sopranos (season 6) episodes